Ksar Boukhari is a town and commune in Médéa Province, Algeria. As of the 2008 census, it had a population of 59,634. The town is bordered by woods and the Atlas mountains, and is built on the Chelif river.

The old walled quarter is on a hill overlooking the main modern town. Ksar el-Boukhari is a commercial centre for pastoral peoples of the interior of Algeria, who trade in wool, livestock and cereals. It also supports a local carpet industry.

Immediately northwest is the village and fort of Boghar (Balcon du Sud), a strategic command post.

References

Communes of Médéa Province